St. Brigid's Primary School may refer to:

 St. Brigid's Primary School, Augher, County Tyrone, Northern Ireland
 St. Brigid's Primary School, Ballymoney, County Antrim, Northern Ireland
 St. Brigid's Primary School, Belleeks, County Armagh, Northern Ireland
 St. Brigid's Primary School, Crossmaglen, County Armagh, Northern Ireland
 St Brigid's Primary School, Brockagh, County Tyrone, Northern Ireland